Advait Chandan is an Indian film director works in Hindi film.  He made his debut as a director in 2017 with the movie Secret Superstar.

Career
In 2007, Advait started his career with Reema Kagti's Honeymoon Travels Pvt. Ltd. as the third assistant director and Taare Zameen Par as the assistant production manager. Collaborating with Aamir Khan again, Advait worked as the casting director and post-production supervisor on Kiran Rao's debut venture Dhobi Ghat.

After donning various roles in the film industry, Advait finally made his directorial debut in 2017 with the film Secret Superstar, featuring Aamir Khan and Zaira Wasim in the lead. He also wrote the screenplay of the film. It was the highest-grossing 2017 Hindi film, and the second-highest-grossing Hindi film of all time, behind only Dangal (2016). It is also the third-highest-grossing Indian film of all time, behind only Dangal and Baahubali 2: The Conclusion (2017), after surpassing Aamir Khan's own PK (2014). His most recent film as a director is the Aamir Khan starrer Lal Singh Chaddha which was released on 11 August 2022.

Filmography

Accolades

References

External links
 
 

Living people
Hindi-language film directors
Indian screenwriters
Film directors from Mumbai
21st-century Indian film directors
Screenwriters from Mumbai
Year of birth missing (living people)